St Mary's College is an independent Roman Catholic coeducational day school in Crosby, Merseyside, about  north of Liverpool. It comprises an early years department "Bright Sparks" (age 4 and under), preparatory school known as "The Mount" (age 4-11) and secondary school with a 6th Form (age 11-18). It was formerly a direct grant grammar school for boys, founded and controlled by the Christian Brothers order. Notable alumni include John Birt, Roger McGough, Tony Booth and Cardinal Vincent Nichols.

Founding and affiliation
The college was established as a boys' school in 1919 by the Irish Christian Brothers, a clerical order founded by Blessed Edmund Rice in the early nineteenth century.

The college became a direct grant grammar school in 1946 as a result of the 1944 Education Act. Post-war alumni describe "a heavy emphasis on rote learning and testing, underpinned by the brutal punishment that the Christian Brothers favoured", "the carrot-and-stick method—without the carrot", "a hard, disciplined education ...generous with the strap". "But it wasn't a bad school; they took working-class Catholic boys, gave them an education and got them to university," "the school was good, and still is", and "the sixth form at St Mary's was an altogether different experience". An article was published in The Guardian in 1998 surrounding alleged sexual abuse at the college. 10 years on the school have yet to make a statement on these allegations.

When direct grants were abolished by the 1974–79 Labour government St Mary's became a private school and is a member of the HMC. It began teaching girls in the sixth form in 1983 and became fully co-educational in 1989. The college is now administered by laypersons, ceasing to be a Christian Brothers' school in January 2006 on becoming an independent charity (St Mary's College Crosby Trust Limited) that "exists to educate children and welcomes families from all faiths".

Location and buildings
St Mary's College is based in Crosby, a suburb of Liverpool, in the Metropolitan Borough of Sefton. The college originally comprised a mansion, Claremont House, on Liverpool Road, Crosby and the neighbouring property, Everest House, until the purpose-built school was built on Everest Road in 1924. Science blocks were added over the years and an assembly hall in 1978. Claremont House is now occupied by the early years department. The Mount preparatory school is located a short distance away in Blundellsands.

The college has its own multi-gym and sports hall, formerly the Mecca Bingo Hall on Liverpool Road, which is open for public use as well as to the students. There are seven laboratories, two workshops and a library. In 2004 a new Sixth Form Centre was built, consisting of a new common room (including a cafe and vending machines) and two computer rooms. Until 1987, the college had a smoking room for the use of Sixth Form pupils who were smokers.

 of playing fields are sited nearby on Little Crosby Road.

Academics
Exam results consistently exceed national averages achieved by state-funded schools, The school aims to develop the person as a whole, not just academically but in many areas: spiritual, moral, intellectual, physical and cultural.

The school song
The former School Song, composed in the 1920s by music master Frederick R. Boraston (1878–1954) was sung by former pupils, most notably at the annual Speech Day, which were once held at Liverpool's Philharmonic Hall.The song is written as a march, with repeated crotchet notes in the opening melody. The unusual seven-bar phrases, and alternating major and minor keys, produce a feeling that is at once rousing and wistful. The words anticipate the day we leave school, and the "broad highway of Life" lies before us. We look forward to reaping "a golden harvest not yet sown", but shall "sometimes pause a moment" to think of yesterday, and the old school and its associations will find a place in our hearts "most wondrous kind". Thoughts of games, songs, and the friends we made give way to thanks that the school has taught us wisdom in both thought and deed. In the soaring finale, pupils past and present raise their voices to cheer St Mary's, and wish her long life, with the repeated Latin exclamation Vivat!

In the 1980s the song was replaced with a completely new song, with words more in tune with the School's co-educational, lay-teacher status.

List of Head-teachers
 Brother Delaney
 Brother Thompson
 Brother Coleman
 Brother Gibbons
 Brother Francis
 Brother Taylor
 Brother O'Halloran (1972-1987)
 Brother Ryan (1987-1990)
 Wilfred Hammond (1990-2003)
 Jean Marsh (2003-2008)
 Michael Kennedy (2008–present)

Notable former teachers
 Eugene Genin MBE (1903–1983), music teacher, pupil of Arthur Catterall; former lead violist with the RLPO; played in the pre-1933 Philharmonic Hall, Liverpool; remained a teacher at the college until he was almost 80.
 Hugh Rank (1913–2006), Viennese-born Jewish teacher of German literature
 Raymond "Bodge" Boggiano DFC (1920–1985), French master; former Lancaster bomber pilot who took part in the raids on Dresden
 Joe Rigby DFC (1924–2002), Maths teacher; former bomber navigator

Notable former pupils

Politics and industry
 John Birt, Lord Birt, Director General of the BBC and advisor to the Blair administration
 Sir Brendan Barber, General Secretary of the TUC
 Kevin McNamara KSG, Labour MP
 Michael Carr, Labour MP
 Therese Coffey, Conservative MP, Deputy Prime Minister of the United Kingdom and Secretary of State for Health and Social Care
 John O'Sullivan CBE, conservative political columnist and pundit; former adviser to Prime Minister Margaret Thatcher
 Kevin Morley, businessman and former MD of Rover Group
 Phil Kelly, journalist and former editor of Tribune; mayor of Islington
 Sir David Rowlands, Permanent Secretary, Department for Transport, 2003–07; Chairman, Gatwick Airport	
 Eric Nevin, former General Secretary NUMAST
 Ray O'Brien CBE, Chief Executive of Nottinghamshire and Merseyside County Councils, Severn Trent Water and FIMBRA
 Mark Gibson, Director Whitehall & Industry Group
Terry Hughes, corporate financier
Vincent Nolan, management consultant, Chairman, Synectics UK

Diplomats and the law
 Ivor Roberts KCMG, former HM Ambassador to Ireland and Italy; current President of Trinity College, Oxford
 Andrew Mitchell, former HM Ambassador to Sweden

Clergy
 Vincent Nichols, Cardinal Archbishop of Westminster, leader of the Roman Catholics of England and Wales.
 John Rawsthorne, Roman Catholic Bishop of Hallam
 Father Gerard Weston MBE - Roman Catholic priest, killed by the Official IRA in the 1972 Aldershot bombing
 Father Brian Foley - Roman Catholic priest and hymnist

Authors, journalists and broadcasters
 Roger McGough CBE, poet, playwright, broadcaster and children's author
 Laurie Taylor, broadcaster and sociologist, presenter of Thinking Allowed; reputedly the inspiration for Howard Kirk in the 1970s novel The History Man
 Professor David Crystal OBE, broadcaster and professor of linguistics
 Nicholas Murray, biographer and novelist, Kafka, Matthew Arnold, Aldous Huxley, Bruce Chatwin
 Will Hanrahan, BBC TV reporter
 Major John Foley MBE, military author and broadcaster
 Joe Ainsworth, scriptwriter Brookside, Holby City, BAFTA winner
 Sean Curran, journalist and presenter of Radio 4's Today in Parliament
 Danny Kelly, BBC WM radio presenter

Educationists
 D. F. Swift, educationist, sociologist

Entertainers
 Tony Booth, actor; the "Scouse Git" in Till Death Us Do Part; father-in-law of Tony Blair
 Tom O'Connor, comedian and former game-show host
 Chris Curtis, Tony West and John McNally, members of the 1960s pop group The Searchers
 Dave Lovelady, member of the 60s pop group The Fourmost
 Ray McFall, owner of The Cavern Club, who first booked The Beatles

Artists
 James Patten, composer
 Pete Lyon, computer graphics games design pioneer

Sportsmen and women
 Mick Murphy - Rugby League footballer; played for Wales, Bradford Northern and Wagga Wagga. 
 Francesca Halsall - British Olympic Freestyle and Butterfly Swimmer.
 Ralph Rensen - Grand Prix motorcycle racer was killed in the I.O.M Senior TT on his Norton in 1961.
 Trent Alexander-Arnold - Footballer for Liverpool F.C.
 Morgan Feeney – footballer for everton

Others
 Frank McLardy - WW2 traitor, Liverpool District Secretary of the British Union of Fascists; founder member of the Waffen-SS British Free Corps; later served as SS-Unterscharführer in the Waffen-SS Medical Corps. Sentenced to life imprisonment (reduced to 15 years) on his return to England. Served seven years and later emigrated to Germany, where he worked as a pharmacist.

Alumni association

The college had an alumni association, St Mary's Old Boys' Club, from 1948 until links were severed due to a scandal and resulting court case, Stringer v. Usher, Smith, Flanagan and Fleming.

The club carried on under the name of St Mary's Old Boys' Club. A further court case, Stringer v. Smith and Shaw followed in 2000 when the committee attempted to change the club's constitution to allow illegal functions at the club premises. Again the committee capitulated, incurring £3000 in costs. In 2000 and 2004 Merseyside Police raised objections to the continuance of the club on the grounds that it was 'improperly run' and for 'blatant disregard' of the licensing laws. Additionally, the Police did not believe the club was operating as a 'bona fide' members club. In March 2010 St Mary's Old Boys' Club closed when the police revoked its licence on the grounds that it was not a bona fide club operated in good faith. Simultaneously, the former club trustees found themselves being sued by their landlords for £72,000 of unpaid rent dating back to 2005.

In fiction
While not explicitly mentioned by name, Anthony Burgess's posthumous novel, Byrne, makes reference to the Christian Brothers, and Crosby; the author had relatives who attended the school, although Burgess himself was educated by the Jesuits.

References

External links

 Early Years Department
 "When our boyhood days are over", a karaoke version of the School Song, played on a digital church organ. (plays with Windows Media Player)
 Class of 1973 website with reminiscences, photos and a rendition of St Mary's school song

Congregation of Christian Brothers secondary schools
Roman Catholic private schools in the Archdiocese of Liverpool
Private schools in the Metropolitan Borough of Sefton
Educational institutions established in 1919
Member schools of the Headmasters' and Headmistresses' Conference
1919 establishments in England
Crosby, Merseyside